Leucauge venusta, known as the orchard spider, is a long-jawed orbweaver spider that occurs from southern Canada to Colombia, along the East coast, reaching into the central US, also in South Asia.The web is often oriented horizontally, with the spider hanging down in the center.

It is distinctively colored, with leaf-green legs and sides (which can sometimes vary to a dark green or even orange). The underside of its thorax is spotted with yellow and black, the top is silvery with brown and black streaks. The neon yellow, orange or red spots on the rear of the abdomen are variable in size among individuals and sometimes absent.

This species is parasitised by a wasp larva which attaches itself externally at the junction of the cephalothorax and abdomen.

A similar species in the same genus is Leucauge mariana.

Gallery

References

 Walckenaer, C. A. 1842. Histoire naturelle des Insects. Aptères. Paris, 2:1-549.

External links

 Picture of L. venusta with egg sac

venusta
Spiders of North America
Spiders of Central America
Spiders of South America
Spiders described in 1842